Wooden Foot Cops on the Highway is the second studio album by English rock band The Woodentops, released in 1988 by record label Rough Trade.

The album reached #48 on the UK albums chart, spending 2 weeks on the chart.

Track listing
"Maybe It Won't Last" - 3:05
"They Can Say What They Want" - 4:15
"You Make Me Feel" - 3:09
"Wheels Turning" - 5:17
"Stop This Car" - 3:21
"Heaven" - 4:05
"What You Give Out" - 3:26
"Tuesday Wednesday" - 3:29
"In a Dream" - 3:27

Personnel
The Woodentops
Rolo McGinty - vocals, acoustic guitar, song writing
Simon Mawby, Anne Stephenson - guitar, vocals
Frank de Freitas - bass guitar, vocals
Benny Staples - drums, vocals
with:
Doug Wimbish - additional bass
Bernie Worrell - additional Clavinet
Fred Maher - additional percussion
Gary Lucas - additional slide guitar
June Miles-Kingston, Mark Lussana Tunkara - additional vocals

References

External links 
 

1988 albums
The Woodentops albums
Rough Trade Records albums
Albums produced by Scott Litt